Kulan (also Romanized as Kūlān) is a village in Poshtdarband Rural District, in the Central District of Kermanshah County, Kermanshah Province, Iran. At the 2006 census, its population was 265 in 62 families.

References 

Populated places in Kermanshah County